Chindia is a portmanteau word that refers to China and India together in general. China and India share long borders, are both regarded as growing countries and are both among the fastest growing major economies in the world. Together, they contain over one-third of the world's population (nearly 2.7 billion). They have been named as countries with the highest potential for growth in the next 50 years in a BRIC report. BRIC is a grouping acronym that refers to the countries of Brazil, Russia, India and China.

Arguments against
Politically, China can be characterized as a single party authoritarian state whereas India is a democracy of hundreds of political parties. India's culture can be characterized by a high degree of pluralism whereas China has a more ethnically homogeneous population, though the concept of Han ethnicity is itself challenged. The commonly cited complementary nature of China and India's economies is also being questioned as the service sector in China is rapidly growing, while India's manufacturing sector has seen rapid growth in recent years. China also has a head start in international marketplaces and is a large investor in Africa. There is also the belief that China has greater geopolitical clout than India as well as a permanent seat on the United Nations Security Council.

Additionally, China's massive infrastructure investments into Pakistan rather than India suggest the concept of Chindia(n) integration may be pre-mature and/or politically inconvenient.

Challenges for growth
It is seen at present for both India and China to overcome major and mutual challenges such as regional and societal income disparities, moving up the value chain towards greater innovation, and also environmental degradation for Chindia to prosper and actually take effect in future.

Serious difficulties in attempting to find a mutually acceptable settlement for a 2520 miles (4056 km) frontier has been a major stumbling block between the two countries ever since India's independence in 1947. Technical discussions have been going on for decades. They will continue. The difference is that these discussions are now coupled with the leaders' firm pledge to find a peaceful solution.

Emerging Asia
China is seen to assert its global leadership. Many countries in the world are now counting on China to lead the recovery from the recent US economic crisis and the European debt crisis. China has also shown leadership ambitions through proposing an alternative reserve currency to the US dollar and extending yuan swap lines to several Asian and even non-Asian states.

Citigroup predicts that the economies of China and India will have surpassed that of the United States by 2030.

Innovation, education and business
Today, China and India are producing some of the world's best-trained computer science and electrical engineering graduates.

See also

References

Further reading
Chindia Biz Blog hosted by the India, China & America Institute
Jagdish N. Sheth. Chindia Rising. New Delhi, McGraw Hill India, 2007. Review Official Website
 The Indian Economy Blog - https://web.archive.org/web/20080115003037/http://indianeconomy.org/, featuring many discussions on India and China's economic performance*\
"Chindia Rising" - Book by Jagdish N. Sheth
BusinessWeek; 12 August 2005; "Chindia": China and India special feature
Do you have a Chindia strategy -Forbes 13 August 2007
Beware the 'Chindia' effect - Mail & Guardian Online
Jairam Ramesh. Making Sense of Chindia: Reflections on China and India. New Delhi, India Research Press, 2005. 
Chindia Lounge, China & India (CHINDIA) Business / Culture / Travel / Outsourcing Resource Blog ChindiaLounge.com by an Asia Business Relations/Marketing Expert.
India Fund perspective
Zhang Chiahou. "Chindia Alert: Forewarned is Forearmed" - a Kindle eBook, Dec 2012 - https://www.amazon.co.uk/dp/B00AQ29ASK

External links
 The Chi-India booster of the world
 Chindia : The next Decade Senior Business Week writer Pete Engardio, credited for having made the Chindia neologism famous, compares the rise of both China and India in this online video conference.
 Radio France International - Asia Pacific - Relations between India and China incl. interview with India Foreign Minister Shivshankar Menon
 Tap into Chindia Global Virtual Seminar Series
India and China: Rivals or fellow 'tigers'? by Marianne Bray (CNN.com)
Silk Road to riches beckons for 'Chindia'(theage.com)
Chindia, where the world's workshop meets its office - The Guardian
Chindia Alert: forewarned is forearmed - from Chindia Alert Unlimited

Economy of India
Economy of China
China–India relations
2000s neologisms